Murray Gordon Jones (26 October 1942 – 12 February 1975) was a New Zealand rugby union player. A prop, Dobson represented  and North Auckland at a provincial level, and was a member of the New Zealand national side, the All Blacks, in 1973. He played five matches for the All Blacks including one test against the touring England side in 1973.

Jones drowned in Auckland Harbour while attempting to rescue his son following a yachting accident. He was buried at North Shore Memorial Park.

References

1942 births
1975 deaths
People from Warkworth, New Zealand
People educated at Takapuna Grammar School
New Zealand rugby union players
New Zealand international rugby union players
Auckland rugby union players
Northland rugby union players
Rugby union props
Accidental deaths in New Zealand
Deaths by drowning in New Zealand
Burials at North Shore Memorial Park
Boating accident deaths
Rugby union players from the Auckland Region